M. S. Rajeswari (24 February 1932 – 25 April 2018) was an Indian playback singer who has recorded over 500 songs in Tamil, Telugu, Malayalam and Kannada language films.

Early life
She was born on 24 February 1932 to Madurai Satagopan and T. V. Rajasundari who herself was a singer and stage artist. Rajeswari was introduced to film singing by family friend B. R. Panthulu.

Career life
She started her career in AVM Studios where she was one of the resident playback singers along with T. S. Bagavathi. Her very first song was Maiyal Migavum Meerudhe in the film Vijayalakshmi produced by Pragathi Pictures, the forerunner to AVM Studios. During the 1940s, she sang for almost all the films produced by AVM before continuing her work independently. In later years, she was a popular voice for child artists.

She rendered songs which consist of solos and duets in all of the AVM Studios early productions such as Nam Iruvar, Rama Rajyam, Vedhala Ulagam, Vazhkai, Jeevitham, Or Iravu, Parasakthi, Gunasagari, Penn and Chella Pillai.

She sang more often in the 1940s and 1950s compared to her work during the 1960s to 1990s. During the later half, she was only sought in songs that voice needed for small children. Films such as Kaveriyin Kanavan, Kaithi Kannayiram and Engal Selvi are the earlier ones where she recorded her voice for child artists. Since 1964 till the 1990s she was only sought for playback for child artists.

She was the first playback singer for Kamal Haasan for the song Ammaavum Neeye Appaavum Neeye in Kalathur Kannamma when she was offered by AVM Studios after a break.

Rajeswari had recorded many songs for Baby Shamili. Her voice suits the best when Shamili was a child artist in Dhurga, Lakshmi Dhurga, Bhairavi, Sendhoora Devi, Sindhoora Devi, Thai Poosam, Sivasangkari, Dheiva Kuzhandhai and Sivarathiri.

Music composers she sang for 
She started her career in AVM Studios under R. Sudarsanam’s music. Later, many of her songs are under K. V. Mahadevan's music direction. In the late 1980s and early 1990s, Shankar–Ganesh engaged her often.

Playback singers she sang with
She sang immemorable duets mostly with T. M. Soundararajan. Others include Seerkazhi Govindarajan, A. M. Rajah, Thiruchi Loganathan, V. J. Varma, K. Devanarayanan, V. N. Sundaram, A. L. Raghavan, S. C. Krishnan, M. Satyanarayana,  Madhavapeddi Satyam, Ghantasala, K. Appa Rao, K. J. Yesudas, S. P. Balasubrahmanyam & Mano.

She also sang duets with female singers, most notably with T. S. Bagavathi. Others are L. R. Eswari, K. Jamuna Rani, P. Susheela, Radha Jayalakshmi, R. Balasaraswathi Devi, A. P. Komala, S. Janaki, K. S. Chithra, Swarnalatha, U. R. Chandra, L. R. Anjali, N. L. Ganasaraswathi, K. Rani, Santha P. Nair & Kalyani.

The singing actors she sang with were K. R. Ramasamy & T. R. Ramachandran.

Death
She died on 25 April 2018 at the age of 87 due to ailments related to old age.

Filmography

References

External links
Listen to M.S. Rajeswari songs on Saavn
Raaga – MS. Rajeswari Tamil songs. MS. Rajeswari
M. S. Rajeswari Tamil songs inp0p Gaana.Com
Old Is Gold/M S Rajeswari Hits
Listen to MS. Rajeshwari songs/music online
Indian Movie Database
M.S. Rajeswari Discography at Discogs
List of Malayalam Songs by Singers M. S. Rajeswari

1932 births
2018 deaths
Tamil playback singers
Telugu playback singers
Malayalam playback singers
Kannada playback singers
Indian women playback singers
20th-century Indian singers
20th-century Indian women singers
21st-century Indian singers
21st-century Indian women singers
Singers from Chennai
Women musicians from Tamil Nadu